Robert Weiner Jr. (born February 22, 1982, in Newport Beach, California) is an international water polo player from the United States, who played for the University of Southern California from 2000 to 2003, and at Newport Harbor High School from 1996 to 1999. As a High School senior he was an All-CIF player leading his team to the CIF Semi Finals and a 24–3 season record.

In 2003, Weiner was a member of the 2003 NCAA Men's Water Polo Championship team. Received 2003 USC Coaches Senior Award. At USC, he majored in International Relations with a minor in Global Communications. In 2014 he graduated with a Masters in Business Administration at USC.

Also played in the Australian National Water Polo League for the UNSW Wests Magpies (2005) and in the Spanish Water Polo League for La Latina in Madrid (2003).

Notable Water Polo Accomplishments 

 2002 - 20 & under National Champion Player with Lamorinda Water Polo Club 
 2003 - NCAA Men's Water Polo Champion - Player
 2004 - Newport Youth Water Polo - Coach
 2005 - Wong Cup Champions UNSW Wests Magpies - Player
 2006 - Newport Youth Water Polo - Coach
 2007 - Newport Harbor High School CIF Champions - Assistant
 2008 & 2009 - Orange Coast College - Coach
 2015 - Joined Otter Bay Water Polo Foundation - Player/Coach

References 

2000 Trojan Water Polo Season Outlook

External links
 Robert Weiner: USC Player Biography
 Newport Harbor Wins in Water Polo - October 23, 1999
 Men's college water polo: USC defeats UCI, 6-4
 USC Class of 2014 Graduate Class

Living people
1982 births
American male water polo players
USC Trojans men's water polo players
USC School of International Relations alumni